Hoseynabad Rural District may refer to various places in Iran:
 Hoseynabad Rural District (Isfahan Province)
 Hoseynabad Rural District (Anar County), Kerman Province
 Hoseynabad Rural District (Anbarabad County), Kerman Province
 Hoseynabad Rural District (Khuzestan Province)

See also
 Hoseynabad-e Jonubi Rural District, Kurdistan Province
 Hoseynabad-e Shomali Rural District, Kurdistan Province